The 1970 UK & Ireland Greyhound Racing Year was the 44th year of greyhound racing in the United Kingdom and Ireland.

Roll of honour

Summary
Tote turnover deductions were changed, with tracks being allowed to charge anything up to 12.5% in deductions. The annual National Greyhound Racing Club returns were released, with totalisator turnover at £55,556,351 and attendances recorded at 7,365,653 from 5585 meetings. 1970 English Greyhound Derby finalist Moordyke Spot won the Oxfordshire Stakes, Playfield Cup, and ran undefeated through the Pall Mall Stakes, contributing to another winning streak of eight including the White City Championship. He was retired to stud in Galway at the end of the year and was named Greyhound of the Year.

Tracks
The Totalisator and Greyhound Holdings (T.G.H) were showing interest in buying stadia. They already held Crayford & Bexleyheath Stadium, Elland Road Greyhound Stadium, Brough Park and Gosforth Greyhound Stadium and then purchased the Midland Greyhound Racing Co Ltd owned tracks of Monmore Green Stadium and Willenhall Greyhound Stadium. Only the Greyhound Racing Association owned more tracks. 

Hall Green Stadium underwent a major renovation when the club house was altered into a four tier restaurant costing £750,000. At the same time, the track kennels were replaced and the contract trainer system was brought in for the first time by the GRA, which would become a trend for most tracks in the near future. One of the contracted trainers was Geoff De Mulder, based from Meriden kennels.   Another GRA track Powderhall modernised and new facilities included a 100 seated restaurant. There were changes too in the GRA trainer ranks with Peter Hawkesley moving to Harringay Stadium from West Ham Stadium to replace the retiring Wilf France. Hawkesley's head kennelhand Ted Parker was promoted to trainer at West Ham, who also appointed Colin West as another trainer. Self-service tote machines were also trialled by the company.  Kings Heath Stadium was then purchased by the GRA Property Trust. 

Perry Barr suffered major damage following a fire, the fire caused extensive damage but the main stand was rebuilt with a new restaurant and bar facilities and the track reopened soon after.

Hendon Greyhound Stadium which was enlarged to hold 5,000 persons before Hackney & Hendon Greyhounds Ltd was subject to a reverse takeover by businessman George Walker, brother of boxing champion Billy Walker. This meant his private company bought a public company and the new merger resulted in a new company called Brent Walker. Plans for the UK's first stand-alone shopping centre would result in the track's closure in 1972. 

White City Stadium (Nottingham) closed after its owner Ernest Jolley, resulting in a sequence of events that led to the sale of the stadium to property developers.

News
Harry 'Bammy' Bamford and Ron Saunders had their first graded runners at Belle Vue Stadium and White City Stadium (Manchester) respectively. The Rayleigh Weir Stadium Racing Manager, Thomas Stanley was unwell and handed the reigns to Roy Vickery, a former Crayford General Manager. Hare coursing became illegal in Northern Ireland and Southend held the first ever televised race meeting in colour. 

Owner/trainer Ernie Gaskin Sr. advertised a litter for sale, after his bitch Come on Dolores whelped to Newdown Heather (Newdown Heather was considered the best sire for many years). Four brothers Bert, Len, John and Arthur White bought four of the litter including a bitch called Dolores Rocket. The black bitch won the Puppy Oaks and Juvenile in 1970, both at Wimbledon and looked set for a big 1971. Dunstable GP Dr Dick Handley died, he was the founder of the Greyhound Breeders Forum. Leading greyhound owner Noel Purvis also died.

Competitions
The Scottish Greyhound Derby returned at Shawfield Stadium, the new home of the event. The Steel City Cup was introduced at Owlerton Stadium. Wimbledon Stadium allowed private trainers to compete in a competition with Wimbledon runners; this gesture was welcomed by the private trainers association due to the fact that not many open races were advertised in the calendar for them. The Duke of Edinburgh Cup national inter-track competition grand final between White City and Brighton, ended with a win for White City. 

Sherrys Prince won the Grand National at White City.

Ireland
The Irish Greyhound Board purchased Harold's Cross Stadium after speculation that it would be demolished for re-development. Irish greyhound owners threatened strikes after the Board held trap draws several days before the meeting. Owners wished to keep draws to half an hour before as in Northern Ireland. 

P.J.Carroll and Co, a cigarette company became the first sponsors of the Irish Greyhound Derby, won by Monalee Pride.

Leading stud dog Printer's Prince dies.

Principal UK races

Totalisator returns

The totalisator returns declared to the licensing authorities for the year 1970 are listed below.

References 

Greyhound racing in the United Kingdom
Greyhound racing in the Republic of Ireland
UK and Ireland Greyhound Racing Year
UK and Ireland Greyhound Racing Year
UK and Ireland Greyhound Racing Year
UK and Ireland Greyhound Racing Year